Lagavulin Bay is a bay on the south of Islay, Scotland.

Directly in this bay lies the Lagavulin distillery. The name Lagavulin is an anglicisation of Lag a' Mhuilinn, Scottish Gaelic for hollow of the mill.

References

Bays of Argyll and Bute
Landforms of Islay